Paolo Romano, also known as Paolo Tuccone and as Paolo di Mariano di Tuccio Taccone was an Italian Renaissance sculptor and goldsmith.  He was active by 1451, and  probably died by 1470.  Giorgio Vasari in his Lives of the Most Excellent Painters, Sculptors, and Architects recounts that Paolo Romano was a modest man whose sculpture was far superior to that of his boastful contemporary Mino del Reame.

The Vatican Museums and the church of Sant'Andrea della Valle in Rome are home to sculptures by Paolo Romano. His disciples include Giovanni Cristoforo Romano.

References 

 Bessone-Aurelj, A.M., Dizionario degli scultori ed architetti italiani, Genova, Società anonima editrice D. Alighieri, 1947.
 Encyclopedia of World Art, New York, McGraw-Hill, 1959–1987.
 Seymour, Charles, Sculpture in Italy, 1400-1500, Baltimore, Maryland, Penguin, 1968.
 Thieme, Ulrich and Felix Becker, editors, Allgemeines Lexikon der bildenden Künstler von der Antike bis zur Gegenwart, Reprint of 1907 edition, Leipzig, Veb E.A. Seemann Verlag, 1980–1986.
 Vasari, Giorgio, Le Vite delle più eccellenti pittori, scultori, ed architettori, many editions and translations.

External links
 Paolo Romano in ArtCyclopedia
 Paolo Romano in the Web Gallery of Art

Italian Renaissance sculptors
Italian goldsmiths
Year of birth missing
Year of death missing
15th-century Italian sculptors
Italian male sculptors
Catholic sculptors